Al-Nu'maniya District is a district of the Wasit Governorate, Iraq. It includes the Al-Ahrar subdistrict. Its seat is An Numaniyah town.

Districts of Wasit Governorate